Avalon is the debut studio album by Australian progressive metal band Chaos Divine. It was released on 12 September 2008 through Firestarter Music & Distribution.

Track listing

Personnel
Chaos Divine
Dave Anderton - Vocals, keyboards
Simon Mitchell - Guitar
Ryan Felton - Guitar, keyboards, artwork
Michael Kruit - Bass guitar
Chris Mitchell - Drums

Additional personnel
Jarrad Hearman - Producer, recording & mixing
Joseph Carra - Mastering, compiling

References

2008 albums